Stephen H. Watson (born 1951) is an American philosopher and Professor of Philosophy at the University of Notre Dame. He is known for his works on aesthetics, the history of philosophy and recent continental philosophy.

Books
 Traditions I (Indiana University Press, 1997)
 Traditions II (Indiana University Press, 2001) 
 Reinterpreting the Political (SUNY Press, 1998)

References

External links
Stephen Watson

21st-century American philosophers
Philosophy academics
Living people
Continental philosophers
University of Notre Dame faculty
Heidegger scholars
1951 births
Duquesne University alumni